Sideswipe is a fictional robot character in the Transformers franchise. Because of trademark restrictions, toys of the character are sometimes marketed as Side Swipe.

Transformers: Generation 1
Sideswipe (sometimes 'Agujero in Mexico, Lambor in Japan, Frérot Québec, Freccia (meaning "arrow") in Italy, Csatár (meaning "striker") in Hungary) is described in his tech file as a brave but often rash warrior. He is almost as skilled as his twin brother Sunstreaker in combat, but is less ruthless. Sideswipe transformed into a red Lamborghini Countach, while his brother, Sunstreaker, transformed into a yellow Lamborghini Countach. Because of his jetpack, Sideswipe was one of few G1 Autobots with the ability to fly and capacity for space flight.

Reception
In 1984 CBC's The Journal did a report on how some people considered Transformers like Sideswipe and other war toys too violent for children. Dreamwave comics artist Pat Lee says his favorite Transformer is Sideswipe.

Animated series
Sideswipe was part of the initial crew of Autobots aboard the Ark when it crash-landed on Earth four million years ago. He awakened along with his fellow Transformers in 1984, with both he and his brother being reformatted into Lamborghini sports cars. Sideswipe loaned Optimus Prime the use of his rocket pack when the Decepticons nearly escaped from Earth with a starship full of energon. Throughout Seasons 1 and 2, Sideswipe was voiced by Michael Bell.

Sideswipe and Sunstreaker often operated together. When antimatter-fueled Decepticons attacked the Ark on one occasion in the episode "Roll for It", Sideswipe and Sunstreaker took to the air to battle with the incoming seeker jets, in a rambunctious, if ultimately ineffective, display of "jet judo."

When investigating tremors that were shaking the Autobot base, Ironhide's scanner found some interesting objects inside a rock wall. Sideswipe, using his piston-like arms, helped Brawn remove the rock wall and found a cave full of dinosaur bones, the discovery of which would lead to the development of the Dinobots.

Towards the end of 1985, Sideswipe, impersonating himself as the Stunticon Breakdown, is among the team of five Autobots who disguised themselves as the Stunticons. Penetrating the Decepticons' camp, the Autobots ran into trouble when the real Stunticons arrived, trying to prove their identities by forming Menasor. With a combination of Windcharger's magnetic powers and Mirage's illusion-creating ability, the Autobots were able to appear as Menasor too, but the deception was soon revealed, though they were still able to thwart the Decepticons' plans. Another major role for Sideswipe was stopping the Combaticons' plot to pull the Earth into the sun, in which he and other Autobots team up with Decepticons to travel to Cybertron. Sideswipe himself reversed the effects of the plot, saving the Earth. Sideswipe reappears in Generation 2: Redux, a Botcon magazine which is set after the events of the final episode where he, along with Goldbug, Jazz, Beachcomber and Seapray battling the Decepticons in Switzerland and gained new powers and color like his G2 self by the power of Forestonite.

In an early script for The Transformers: The Movie there was a scene planned where Sideswipe, Red Alert and Tracks hop off Ultra Magnus to attack Devastator, but they are pushed back and Red Alert is shot in the back and killed.

Sideswipe appears in the first two episodes of the Japanese series Transformers: Headmasters, participating with Ultra Magnus, the Trainbots, and Prowl (who may have mistakenly appeared, as he was killed in The Transformers: The Movie) on a shootout against the Triple Changers, Soundwave, and Sixshot. During a segment of this intense shootout, Sideswipe manages to hit Frenzy and later, after foiling a new Decepticon assault, has also a line.

Books
Sideswipe appeared in the 1984 sticker and story book Return to Cybertron written by Suzanne Weyn and published by Marvel Books.

Sideswipe was featured in the 1985 Transformers audio book Autobots' Lightning Strike.

Sideswipe appeared in the 1986 story and coloring book The Lost Treasure of Cybertron by Marvel Books.

Sideswipe was featured in the 1993 Transformers: Generation 2 coloring book "Decepticon Madness" by Bud Simpson.

Comics

3H Enterprises
Sideswipe returned in the pages of the BotCon exclusive Transformers: Universe comics. He was amongst the Autobot heroes of the Great War welcomed back to Cybertron. However, all of them were transported away by Unicron. Reformatted into a new body, he was forced to fight for Unicron's amusement (and unbeknownst to all, so that the Spark energy from fallen combatants could revitalize his own shattered frame). He ends up fighting his own brother. All were subsequently freed by the resurrected Optimus Primal, and Sideswipe went on to serve him as part of the new Autobot faction.

Although Universe ended at issue #3, the flashback of Optimus Prime would reveal what happened. In the final battle between the forces of Optimus Primal and Unicron, the Chaos-Bringer had disappeared (due to the events of Transformers: Energon), with Primal's forces barely making it out. Sideswipe was among those seen escaping.

Devil's Due Publishing
In this reimagining of the Generation One story, the Ark was discovered by the terrorist Cobra organization, and all the Transformers inside were reformatted into Cobra vehicles remotely controlled by the Televipers. In this storyline Sideswipe and Sunstreaker both turned into Cobra Stingers. Destro attempted to use them in a battle against G.I. Joe, but the two of them were temporarily put out of commission by Wheeljack. They were later seen fighting the Decepticons on Cobra Island.

Sideswipe reappeared in the third crossover series as part of the combined Autobot/G.I. Joe force trying to rescue Optimus Prime. Sideswipe returned in the fourth crossover as part of a group led by Prowl working with former G.I. Joe leader Hawk to stop the spread of Cybertronian technology on Earth. After failing to apprehend Destro, the group relaxed on their ship - only to be attacked by the Monster Pretenders, with Sideswipe being incapacitated. He was later shown being repaired.

Dreamwave Productions
Before the civil war between the Autobots and the Decepticons, Sideswipe was a merchant. After the war broke out he joined the Autobots. When Optimus Prime disappeared in an accident with a space bridge, the Autobots splintered into smaller factions. Sideswipe stayed with the main Autobot force, now under the leadership of Prowl.

With the Autobots learned that the Decepticons were testing a new mobile command base at the Praetorus Wharf, Sideswipe was part of a small investigation team led by Prowl. They discovered the mobile command base to be Trypticon and were forced to battle with little chance of success until the giant Decepticon was ordered to leave.

Some time after being reawakened on Earth four million years later, Sideswipe was aboard a ship named 'The Ark II' created by the Autobots and their human allies to end the war on Earth and return to Cybertron. However, the ship was sabotaged and exploded shortly after take-off. The human allies were killed, but Sideswipe and other Autobots were lost in the ocean. Sideswipe and the other lost Autobots were later found by Optimus Prime who used the Matrix to revive them. Sideswipe fought in the battle against the Decepticons in San Francisco, attacking Soundwave with Sunstreaker.

When Ultra Magnus came to Earth claiming that the Earth-based Autobots were Cybertonian criminals; Optimus Prime surrendered and returned to Cybertron with half of his force. Sideswipe was amongst those ordered to stay behind, now under the command of Jazz.

Sideswipe and the other Autobots who remained on Earth were attacked by Starscream and Bruticus. Sideswipe fell in this battle and was later repaired by the Earth Defense Command.

As part of a small group led by Jazz and Marissa Faireborn of the Earth Defense Command to search for missing soldiers and solve the mystery of the deserted city, Sideswipe found and battled the Insecticons along with his twin brother Sunstreaker. After defeating the Insecticons, the Autobots rejoined the other Autobots and were led by Prowl to the site of the future Autobot City: Earth.

Fun Publications

Classicverse
In Transformers Invasion Sideswipe is among the Autobots in Canada who help get people to safety from an Earthquake caused by Shattered Glass Ultra Magnus using the Terminus Blade.

Wing of Honor
Long Haul appears in "A Flash Forward" by Fun Publications. In the year 2005 Devastator attacks Autobot City. He is opposed by Ultra Magnus, Sideswipe, Red Alert and Tracks. Firing every weapon they have, the Autobots are able to force Devastator to break apart into the individual Constructicons. Now outnumbered the Autobots retreated. Red Alert is killed covering the withdrawal, as Megatron watches. These events and others are related to Jhaixus by Runabout and Runamuck in 2013.

Sideswipe appears in the story Generation 2: Redux where he is among the reinforcements from Autobot City to respond to the Decepticon attack at the Large Hadron Collider in Switzerland. Once there the Autobots are able to defeat the Decepticons, but during the fight the Autobots are exposed to refined Forestonite, which enhances and mutates Cybertronian systems. He gets enhanced to his Generation 2 form.

Spark commands an Autobot shuttle crewed by Blaze, Hubcap, Sideswipe, Streetstar and Windbreaker into space where they intercept a distress call from Spike Witwicky on the planet Nebulos. When the Autobots arrive on Nebulos they meet Spike and Carly Witwicky, Chip Chase and the Autobots Brainstorm, Chromedome, Crosshairs and Highbrow who inform them that the Nebulan scientist Hi-Q is missing. They learn from Hi-Q's assistant Hi-Test that Hi-Q had security monitors and through them discover the scientist was kidnapped by the Decepticons Runabout and Runamuck.

IDW Publishing
Long ago, before the war, Sunstreaker and Sideswipe were law enforcers working under the Senate, and were involved with the arrest of Impactor.

Sideswipe made his first IDW Publishing appearance in the Spotlight issue on Galvatron. Assigned to Hound's unit on Cybertron guarding Thunderwing's body.

Chafing under Hound's command due to Sunstreaker going missing on Earth (in The Transformers: Escalation), Sideswipe clashed with his superior, even going over his head to call Optimus Prime on Earth, being reprimanded as a result. However, the matter was rendered moot when the mysterious Galvatron appeared, killing Leadfoot. An enraged Sideswipe blasted him, and was blasted aside as a result. While the rest of Hound's unit engaged Galvatron, Sideswipe recovered and blew apart Galvatron's head with a single full-powered shot. As Hound chastised him, the undead Galvatron recovered and rendered the whole unit unconscious with one blast, before leaving with Thunderwing.

Sideswipe and his unit were redeployed to Earth under Optimus Prime's orders in issue #1 of The Transformers: Devastation, but were rediverted to Garrus-9 following the Decepticons' abduction of the Monstructor components.

Sideswipe has appeared among the Autobots on Cybertron in All Hail Megatron. He now appears to have a form based on the Universe Classics Series Sideswipe toy.

Marvel Comics
In the original Marvel Transformers comics, Sideswipe's role was largely similar to that of the animated series, serving as a loyal warrior under Optimus Prime.

Sideswipe joined the list of the long-term injured during the Dinobot Hunt. He was charged, along with Bluestreak and Huffer, with bringing in the powerful Dinobot, Grimlock. Unfortunately, the party found the mentally ill Grimlock locked in vicious combat with Sludge, who had been planted there by the Decepticons. Sideswipe was seriously injured while trying to contain the situation, but managed at least to put out a distress call, alerting Prowl and Optimus Prime.

He appeared to avoid deactivation by the Underbase powered Starscream, he was not seen again after issue #50 of the US comic.

He appeared again in the Generation 2 comics as part of a raiding party under Grimlock that was outthought and captured by the forces of Jhiaxus. He was freed by Prime, and later appeared battling the Swarm.

Toys
 Generation 1 Deluxe Car Sideswipe (1984)
Sideswipe's toy was originally part of a Takara toyline called Diaclone before Hasbro took some of the toys to use for Transformers. Sideswipe was one of the first Transformers to be released. Because they were both Lamborghinis, Sideswipe and Sunstreaker were characterized as fraternal twins.
The Tech Specs and TF: Universe profiles for Sideswipe describe the Sunstreaker toy. The rocket backpack describes Sunstreaker's engine, which is on his upper back in robot mode, and the shoulder mounted flares refer to the two yellow pods that mount on Sunstreaker's shoulders.
The mold used for the original Sideswipe also used for the first Generation 2 Sideswipe, and the Japanese-exclusive Autobots Tigertrack, Clampdown and Deep Cover. The Japanese variants are based on original variants used in the Diaclone line. The police car that became Clampdown was the basis for the fire escort Red Alert.

 Generation 1 Action Master Sideswipe with Vanguard (1991)
As part of Europe's continuing exclusive Transformer toys, Sideswipe returned as an Action Master, along with his new partner - the battle droid Vanguard. Vanguard transformed into a backpack for Sideswipe to wear which came equipped with a protective double-barreled helmet.

 Generation 2 Autobot Car Sideswipe (1993)
Slightly remolded and recolored black, Sideswipe was re-released in the Transformers: Generation Two toy line.

 Generation 2 Go-Bot Sideswipe (1995)
Sideswipe was released a second time in Generation Two as a blue Lamborghini Diablo, a recolor of an Autobot named Firecracker as part of the Go-Bots line. This toy was later recolored as Robots in Disguise R.E.V.

 Universe Spy Changer Sideswipe (unreleased)
First announced in Previews magazine for December 2002 were a set of 5 Autobot Spy Changers - Wheeljack, Sideswipe, Trailbreaker, Prowl and Mirage.

 Smallest Transformers Lambor (2003)
In Japan a miniature version of Sideswipe was released as part of the Smallest Transformers line. Later remolded into Smallest Alert

 Universe Deluxe Sideswipe (2003)
After a long absence, the original Sideswipe returns with a new toy. This time it is a BotCon exclusive, a remold of the Robots in Disguise toy Prowl. He came packaged with his now identical twin Sunstreaker. Both turned into Lamborghini Diablos.

 Alternators Sideswipe (2003)Side Swipe (with a space for trademark reasons) was the second Transformer to be released in the Alternators/Binaltech toyline by Hasbro/Takara. In the Binaltech line, Side Swipe is named Lambor, for simplicity's sake he is referred to as Side Swipe for this article. Side Swipe's alternate mode is a Dodge Viper SRT 10.Remy's Transformers - TFkenkon.com 
The mold for this figure was also used for Dead End and Sunstreaker.

 Generation 1 Reissue Sideswipe (2005)
The original Sideswipe toy was reissued in 2005. Originally planned to be a Toys R Us exclusive, the line was canceled before Sideswipe was released. With the toys having already been made, they were instead sold through Kaybee stores as a discount price.

 Titanium SideswipeA three inch tall non-transforming toy based on his Alternators form.

 Universe Classic Series Deluxe Sideswipe (2008)
Part of the first wave of the Transformers: Universe Classic Series line, this figure is a modern redesign of G1 Sideswipe, faithfully keeping his form as a Lamborghini while incorporating the detail and articulation technology of current Transformers toys. He is a red redeco of Sunstreaker with a different head sculpt and the upper torso reversed to have the car's front end as his chest (as opposed to Sunstreaker's chest being the car's roof). The hands have also been swapped to properly match Sideswipe's robot mode. On the back of his car mode, his license plate reads, "SWIPE".
The figure was first announced along with Sunstreaker by Hasbro at BotCon 2007. Concept art of both was displayed by Hasbro at the 2007 San Diego Comic-Con International. On January 23, 2008, the Transformers Collectors Club revealed a pictures of both his vehicle and robot mode to members only. This picture was quickly reprinted on the ToyFare magazine web site. A packaged version of this toy first appeared on ebay in March 2008.
The mold for this figure was also used for Henkei/Generations Red Alert (as an homage to the original G1 figure being a redeco of Sideswipe), as well as the BotCon 2010 exclusive Breakdown and the Collectors Club exclusive Punch-Counterpunch.

 Henkei! Henkei! C-09 Deluxe Lambor (2008)
The Japanese version of the Universe Classic Series Sideswipe by Takara Tomy has the flare launcher and rear spoiler remolded in chrome silver. His license plate reads, "LAMBOR". Unlike the Universe version, this figure is missing the engine attachment.

 Timelines Deluxe Sideswipe (2010)
This toy was made for the Customizing Class at Botcon 2010. It is the Universe Deluxe Classic Series toy repainted in G2 colors.

 Masterpiece MP-12 Lambor (2012)
On March 2012, Takara Tomy released a teaser picture of Lambor as the 12th entry in the upscale Masterpiece toy series. The figure retains his original Lamborghini Countach LP500S alternate mode, which fits inside MP-10 Convoy/Optimus Prime's trailer.
The mold for this figure will also be used for MP-14 Red Alert.

 Generations Deluxe Sideswipe (2012)
A remold of Generations Jazz. This toy was repurposed in the IDW Publishing comics as Generation 1 Sideswipe.

Transformers: Robots in Disguise

As a release of an unused Generation 2 Go-Bots mold, the name Side Swipe is reused for the first time on an unrelated toy to the original. This toy did not receive any characterization and did not appear in the show or any other fiction.

Toys
 Robots in Disguise Spy Changer Side Swipe (2001)
A small transformable figure based on the unreleased Generation 2 Go-Bot Rumble. Bundled with Spy Changer Prowl 2.
This figure was later repainted as Transformers: Universe Silverstreak.

Transformers: Armada

Originally called Stepper in the Japanese series "Micron Legend", he was renamed Sideswipe (with a space) when Hasbro released the series in America. Transforming into a blue Nissan Skyline, Sideswipe's alternate mode is as realistic as an Armada toy can get to an actual vehicle. However, his robot mode is considered by many to be very poorly designed and is the subject of much ridicule.

Note: Early packaging of Sideswipe spelled his name without a space, but it was later added. According to online posts by Hasbro employees there was a mixup in the naming of Sideswipe and Mini-Con Nightbeat, and the original intention was for them to have each other's name, making this toy a true homage to the original Nightbeat.

Animated series
Sideswipe first appears in the Armada episode "Past"(Part 1) as a rookie in Optimus Prime's squad. He is rather ridiculous and awkward youth. In the animated series it is revealed that once he had been saved from Decepticon execution by Blurr, and has travelled to Earth to join him at last. But Blurr is not too glad to have such a subordinate. So, by Prime's consent, he charges Hot Shot to take care of Sideswipe. Initially Hot Shot is displeased very much that he has to fuss over such a misfit, but he begins to train him, however. When Hot Shot's former friend Wheeljack arrives and attacks him, Sideswipe does his best to defend his trainer. And when Sideswipe himself is taken a prisoner by Wheeljack, Hot Shot immediately races to his rescue. Though the conflagration threatens to consume them all, Hot Shot abandons the fight to save Sideswipe, successfully getting him out just in time. Since this moment Sideswipe hero-worships his new friend, much to Hot Shot's amusement, though the latter sometimes feels annoyed with such enthusiastic displays of friendship and even tries to get away from his admirer.

Sideswipe always did everything to prove his fighting skill to everyone in practice, but he never had become a great warrior, however. Nevertheless, he proved to be a real boon for the Autobots because of his good understanding of the computers (for example, he succeeded in deciphering the secret access code of the Decepticon Base revealed by Starscream). Later, Sideswipe served as Hot Shot's most loyal soldier when that one briefly took command of the Autobots after Optimus Prime's death.

Dreamwave Productions
Sideswipe also appeared in Dreamwave's  Transformers: Armada comic, with a much lesser role. He first appeared in issue #14. He was one of a team of Autobots under Jetfire who investigated odd Space Bridge activity at the Decepticon HQ - unaware it had been taken over by the Heralds of Unicron. Bludgeon was still present, and stalked Jetfire's team. Sideswipe survived relatively unscathed - unlike Blurr and Dropshot - and helped to eventually destroy the samurai Decepticon.

Sideswipe was last seen in issue #18 of the Armada series and did not make any appearances in the Transformers: Energon comic series.

Toys
 Armada Deluxe Sideswipe with Nightbeat (2003)
Armada Sideswipe is a homage to Generation 1 Nightbeat, the character his Mini-Con is named after.
Armada Sideswipe was remolded into Universe Treadshot, Universe Oil Slick and used in the Cybertron line as the Decepticon Runamuck (Runabout in Japan).

Transformers: Timelines (Shattered Glass)

This Sideswipe (again spelled without a space) is an alternate universe version of the Generation 1 character from the BotCon exclusive Shattered Glass comic, in which the Decepticons are on the side of good and the Autobots are evil.

Although initially an evil Autobot, Sideswipe was betrayed by Optimus Prime - who killed Sideswipe's mentor Drench. Sideswipe repainted himself in Drench's colors while bearing a scar across his chest, and joined the Decepticons to avenge his mentor's death. He is partnered with the Decepticon Micromaster Whisper, who he refers to as his "Mini-Con."

Fun Publications
Sideswipe appears as a member of Megatron's forces in the Transformers: Timelines story "Shattered Glass" by Fun Publications. He befriends a lost Autobot named Cliffjumper, a traveler from another dimension where the Autobots are heroic, and helps the Decepticons in the attack on the Ark launch site.

Sideswipe appears in the fiction "Dungeons & Dinobots", a text based story. He defends the Arch-Ayr fuel dump from an Autobot attack and later helps capture the Dinobots Slugfest and Goryu for the Decepticons. Cliffjumper and Sideswipe then track Grimlock to an ancient crypt, which ends up being the home of the life-creating computer known as the Omega Terminus. They are joined by the Autobots Rodimus and Blurr, who are also hunting Grimlock. The enemies end up joining forces to fight Grimlock, the Terminus and a host of zombie transformers, including Drench and this world's Cliffjumper. They escape, but their memories of the event are suppressed by the Terminus.

In "Do Over", Sideswipe is present when Megatron announces the impending launch of the Nemesis, designed to stop the Autobot warship known as the Ark. The Nemesis launches after the Ark, and after a brief battle the Nemesis is shot down and crashes on Earth, with the crew escaping in stasis pods. Although not directly depicted, Sideswipe is a member of the crew of the Nemesis.

In Blitzwing Bop, Sideswipe, Bombshell and Blitzwing stop a scheme by Elita One and Brawn to make attack drones from human cars by implanting control devices in the cars in a car wash.

Toys
 Timelines Deluxe Sideswipe with Whisper (2008)
A redeco of Armada Wheeljack with the colors of Generation 2 Drench. As with the original Wheeljack figure, Sideswipe has a deep scar molded across the Autobot symbol on his chest. He came packaged with the Decepticon Mini-Con/Micromaster Whisper. This toy was inspired by a canceled Universe Drench toy Hasbro only produced as a prototype.

Transfomers Cinematic Universe

Sideswipe appears in the second and third of the live action film series. He transforms into a Chevrolet Corvette Stingray Concept in 2009 and a Chevrolet Centennial Corvette convertible in 2011. He has two wheeled feet like Bonecrusher from the first film. Sideswipe is armed with Cybertanium blades. Early concept art of Sideswipe portrayed him as being red, but he ended up silver, presumably due to director Michael Bay's notion that the color red does not photograph well on film (the same reason Optimus Prime in the film series is primarily blue over red). His Hasbro battle bio states that he is 15 ft. tall and that he is a master in almost every form of martial arts on Cybertron.

In Revenge of the Fallen, Sideswipe has 4 lines and first appears in the chase in Shanghai, China, pursuing the Decepticon Sideways. Using his wheeled feet to maneuver, Sideswipe somersaulted over him while shooting at him, then threw one of his arm blades into the front of Sideways' vehicle mode. As he landed, Sideswipe reattached the blade (which was still embedded in Sideways) and forced it lengthwise down Sideways' body, cutting him in half. He was also seen in the fight against the Decepticons after Optimus Prime was killed by Megatron as Bumblebee and the twins escaped with Sam. Sideswipe was surrounded by the human military and forced to go back to the Autobot base alongside Ironhide, Ratchet, Arcee, Chromia, Elita-One and Jolt. They arrived in Egypt and fought against many Decepticons. Sideswipe was the first to spot Sam and watched as Optimus Prime was resurrected. Sideswipe was brushed aside by The Fallen when he teleported in front of them.

Sideswipe returns in Transformers: Dark of the Moon as one of the main Autobots. He accompanies Bumblebee, Que/Wheeljack, and Dino/Mirage when they investigated a nuclear facility in the Middle East. Later he joined Dino and Bumblebee in accompanying the humans to find out more about the Space Race. Sideswipe helped Bumblebee and Dino fight the three Dreads on the highway, who are after Sentinel Prime, using his stealth force weapons to shoot at Hatchet. He then helped Ironhide finish off Crowbar and Crankcase in a Mexican Standoff, as Sideswipe called it. Sideswipe was expelled from Earth along with the other Autobots and was thought to have perished when Starscream destroyed the Xanthium. He participated in the final battle in Chicago. He was captured by the Decepticons and witnessed the death of Que. He almost shared Que's fate, but escaped after Wheelie and Brains crashed a Decepticon carrier ship. He helped Bumblebee and Ratchet fire at incoming Decepticons, and briefly battled Sentinel Prime alongside them, but he was knocked backwards by the treacherous Prime. Sideswipe was among the surviving Autobots at the end of the film.

Sideswipe does not appear in Age of Extinction, but his death is confirmed in an Age of Extinction Topps Europe collector card, in which Optimus is described as mourning his, Ratchet's, and Flash (Leadfoot)'s deaths at the hands of Cemetery Wind and Lockdown.

Related film media

IDW Publishing
Sideswipe first appeared in Transformers: Alliance #4 as one of the Autobots who responded to Optimus Prime's call to Earth. He joined with Optimus' team as part of NEST.

Sideswipe was spotlighted in Tales of the Fallen #2, which revealed the Autobot trained under Ironhide, and was charged with protecting an Autobot colony from the Decepticons. The Decepticon Demolishor attacked and killed all but Sideswipe, laying waste to the colony. Sideswipe vowed revenge, and upon arriving on Earth, chased after his nemesis without care for any innocent in the crossfire. Ironhide arrived and tried to stop Sideswipe, but it was only when Ironhide called Sideswipe "no better than the enemy" did Sideswipe stand down, and Demolishor escaped.

Sideswipe appears in Transformers: Nefarious #1, set months after the events of the 2009 film. Alice steals an RV in Seattle and is chased by Skids and Mudflap, who keep her occupied until Sideswipe arrives and defeats her. She is taken to N.E.S.T. headquarters on Diego Garcia to be examined by Ratchet. Sideswipe was disgusted by her decision to disguise herself as a human.

Cyber Missions
Sideswipe is shown to be helping Optimus Prime against Megatron. Later he fights against Barricade and Frenzy. Afterwards he helps Ratchet against Lockdown. Sideswipe is later seen with Ratchet transporting energon when they are attacked by Starscream and Mindwipe.

Video games
Sideswipe is playable character in the PSP version of Transformers: The Game, the video game tie-in to the 2007 live-action Transformers film.
He is a part of the Transformers: Revenge of the Fallen Character and Map Pack Plus DLC pack that was released on August 27 on Xbox 360 and PlayStation 3. This pack also includes a version of Sideswipe painted in red. He is a playable character in the PSP version and the Autobot Nintendo DS version, which is during Challenge Modes only.

Sideswipe is among the characters who appear in the TRANSFORMERS CYBERVERSE Battle Builder Game.

Sideswipe is a playable character in some single-player missions and in the multiplayer section of the PS3 and Xbox 360 game Transformers: Revenge of the Fallen. In Transformers: Dark of the Moon for PS3 and Xbox 360, he is only playable in multiplayer.

Live-action film-related toys
All toys of this character (except the RPM/Speed Stars diecast cars) are officially licensed from General Motors.

 Revenge of the Fallen Legends Sideswipe (2009)
A new mold of Sideswipe. Also redecoed in red as Swerve.
This toy was later packaged with Autobot Legends Mudflap and Decepticon Deluxe Fearswoop in a special Walmart exclusive 3-pack.
 Revenge of the Fallen Legends Bluesteel Sideswipe (2009)
A bluish gray redeco of the Legends figure.
 Revenge of the Fallen Fast Action Battlers Battle Blade Sideswipe (2009)
A Deluxe-sized figure designed with easy transformation for younger children.
 Revenge of the Fallen Fast Action Battlers Night Blades Sideswipe (2009)
A dark gray redeco of the Fast Action Battlers figure.
 Revenge of the Fallen Gravity Bots Sideswipe (2009)
A new toy made for younger children. Instantly transforms to robot when tilted upwards.
 Revenge of the Fallen RPMs Battle Chargers Sideswipe (2009)
A toy car made for younger children. Features pull-back action and sound effects. The top section pops open to reveal the robot mode when the car hits an object.
 Revenge of the Fallen Deluxe Sideswipe (2009)
A Deluxe-sized figure that transforms from Chevrolet Corvette Stingray Concept to Robot and features retractable blades on his forearms. MechAlive feature consists of hydraulics on his legs.
The figure was remolded with a new head and a red redeco as Swerve.
 Revenge of the Fallen Human Alliance Sideswipe with Tech Sergeant Epps (2009)
A fully detailed figure that comes with a 2" poseable Sgt. Robert Epps figure. Robot mode features retractable battle mask and spinning blades. The Epps figure can fit on the seats in Sideswipe's car mode or be placed in strategic areas to man Sideswipe's auxiliary weapons in robot mode.
 Revenge of the Fallen Deluxe Strike Mission Sideswipe (2009)
A repaint of the original Deluxe figure with red-tinted windows, a black stripe which races across his door, and a N.E.S.T. logo on each door.
 Transformers Deluxe Sidearm Sideswipe (2010)
A totally different mold and transformation compared to the previous Deluxe figure with red flames on the car mode's front end. The forearm blades are replaced with pistols; as a result, the side panels that formed the blades are now part of the backpack in robot mode.
 Autobot Alliance AA-06 Deluxe Sidearm Sideswipe (2010)
The Japanese version of Sidearm Sideswipe by Takara Tomy omits the red flames and has the windows molded in smoke gray.
 Transformers Hunters Rumble Deluxe Sideswipe (2010)
A slight redeco with light blue highlights. Bundled with Barricade (which is in a white/black/checkered blue and yellow redeco).
 Transformers Human Alliance Shadow Blade Sideswipe with Mikaela Banes (2010)
A black/silver redeco of the Human Alliance figure with a figure of Mikaela that wears a black leather jacket and blue jeans.
 Dark of the Moon Cyberverse Legion Sideswipe (2011)
An all-new Legion (formerly Legends) mold of Sideswipe.
 Dark of the Moon Mech Tech Deluxe Sideswipe (2011)
An all-new Deluxe mold of Sideswipe with a different transformation. His Mech Tech weapon is a giant blaster with a retractable blade. Unlike the previous figures, this version is molded in gray and not painted in metallic silver.
The mold for this figure is also used for the Decepticon Darksteel as an homage to Quickstrike from the Transformers: Beast Wars series.
 Dark of the Moon Deluxe Sidearm Sideswipe (2011)
A Walmart exclusive redeco of the 2010 Sidearm Sideswipe figure in blue with yellow stripes as an homage to the Generation 2 Go-Bots Sideswipe toy. The figure's car mode is decorated with a large white Autobot symbol on the hood and the number 04 on the doors, roof and rear end (a nod to the ID number of the Japanese G1 toy, which was known as Lambor). Other homage decals on the car mode include "Sun Bro" (which could be short for "Sunstreaker's Brother"), "Lithonian Drivetrain" (a reference to the planet Unicron devours in the beginning of The Transformers: The Movie), "Rattraps" (a reference to the Beast Wars character of the same name), "Maccadam's" (a reference to a Cybertronian pub depicted in several Transformers series) and a TransTech symbol.
 Dark of the Moon Flash Freeze Assault Human Alliance Sideswipe (2011)
A gray redeco of the Human Alliance figure with black and white stripes, bundled with the Decepticon Icepick (black redeco) and Sergeant Chaos.
 Dark of the Moon The Scan Series Deluxe Sideswipe (2011)
A Toys "R" Us exclusive remold of the Revenge of the Fallen Deluxe figure with light blue highlights in the middle before fading into clear plastic, simulating the effect of vehicle scanning.
 Dark of the Moon Robo Power Go-Bots Sideswipe (2012)
A transforming toy car aimed at younger children. The pull-back mechanism transforms the car into a rolling robot while in motion.
 Age of Extinction Deluxe Sideswipe (2015)
A silver redeco of the Deluxe Mechtech Sideswipe, featuring extensive silver deco similar to the TakaraTomy release of the Deluxe Sidearm Sideswipe figure. He includes Age of Extinction Crosshairs's weapons.
 The Last Knight Tiny Turbo Changer Sideswipe (2017)
 Dark of the Moon Studio Series Sideswipe (2018)

Non-transforming merchandise
 Revenge of the Fallen Power Bots Sideswipe (2009)
A non-transformable robot toy designed for younger children. Features light and sound effects, with the wheeled feet emitting tire screeching sounds.
 Revenge of the Fallen RPMs Speed Series Sideswipe (2009)
A diecast toy of Sideswipe in car mode in the same size as Hot Wheels or Matchbox cars. An illustration of his robot mode is molded on the underside of the car. Due to licensing issues, this incarnation of Sideswipe is not a Chevrolet Corvette Stingray Concept; instead, it is a cross between a Mitsubishi Eclipse and an Aston Martin DB9.
 Revenge of the Fallen RPMs Sideswipe vs. Wreckloose (2009)
A redeco of RPMs Sideswipe with red stripes. Bundled with the Decepticon Wreckloose (a green redeco of Sideways).
 Revenge of the Fallen RPMs Sideswipe (Robot Mode) (2010)
A diecast toy of Sideswipe, but in robot mode and in a running pose.

Aligned

Books
Sideswipe appears in the novels Transformers: Exodus, Transformers: Exiles, and Transformers: Retribution.

Games
Sideswipe is one of the playable Autobots in the 2010 video game Transformers: War for Cybertron. He, along with Optimus and Bumblebee, are captured by the Decepticons and taken to Kaon prison as part of an elaborate plan to free Zeta Prime and other imprisoned Autobots. The trio battle Soundwave and his minions on their way to rescuing Zeta Prime.

Sideswipe also appears in its sequel Transformers: Fall of Cybertron where he helps get Jazz and Cliffjumper to the Sea of Rust to search for Grimlock.

Sideswipe appears in Transformers: Rise of the Dark Spark as a playable character in Single Player mode and an unlockable character in the new Escalation mode. In the game, he helps Ironhide retrieve the Dark Spark before the Decepticons do, and deliver it to Optimus Prime.

 Animated series 
Sideswipe appears as one of the main characters in the Transformers: Robots in Disguise, the sequel series to Transformers: Prime, voiced by Darren Criss. Originally a rebellious Autobot on Cybertron who delights in vandalism, Sideswipe is captured by Lieutenant Bumblebee and Female Cadet Strongarm and ends up traveling with them to Earth. He ends up an unlikely member of Bumblebee's new team along with Grimlock and the Mini-Con Fixit, attempting to recapture fugitive Decepticons.

Toys
 Generations Deluxe Sideswipe (2012)
A remold of Generations Jazz. This toy was repurposed in the IDW Publishing comics as Generation 1 Sideswipe.

Transformers Animated

Sideswipe is one of the BotCon 2011 exclusive figures, painted in his Generation 2 black and red colors.

Fun Publications
After the events of Transformers Animated the Stunticons set up a Stunt Convoy show in the city of Kaon and used it as a cover to attempt to break Megatron out of his detention at Trypticon. Their efforts were thwarted thanks to the efforts of Cheetor, Optimus Prime and Sideswipe. The Stunticons were placed in detention with Megatron and an attempt to rescue them was made by the Decepticons Blot, Mindwipe, Oil Slick, Scalpel, Sky-Byte and Strika.

His tech spec appeared on a lithograph sold at Botcon 2011.

 Toys 
 Timelines Deluxe Sideswipe (2011)
A BotCon exclusive black/red/neon green redeco of Transformers Animated Deluxe Rodimus Minor with Breakdown's head sculpt.

Kre-O Transformers

Sideswipe is an Autobot who turns into a car.

Animated series
Kreon Sideswipe appeared in the animated short "Last Bot Standing."

Kreon Sideswipe appeared in the animated short "Bot Stars."

Kreon Sideswipe appeared in the animated short "The Big Race."

Kreon Sideswipe appeared in the animated short "A Gift For Megatron."

Toys
 Kre-O Transformers Sideswipe' (2011)
A Lego-like building block kit of Sideswipe with 220 pieces to assemble in either car or robot mode. Comes with 2 Kreon figures of Sideswipe and a human driver.

References

External links
 Sideswipe at the Transformers Wiki
 Sideswipe galleries at Seibertron.com
 Sideswipe at TFU.info

Transformers characters
Television characters introduced in 1984
Fictional male martial artists
Fictional robots
Fictional twins
Male characters in animated series
Male characters in comics
Male characters in film